Normunds Aplociņš (born 2 June 1969) is a Latvian freestyle skier. He competed in the men's moguls event at the 1992 Winter Olympics.

References

1969 births
Living people
Latvian male freestyle skiers
Olympic freestyle skiers of Latvia
Freestyle skiers at the 1992 Winter Olympics
People from Sigulda